The Love Gamble is a 1925 American silent drama film directed by Edward LeSaint and starring Lillian Rich, Robert Frazer and Pauline Garon.

Cast
 Lillian Rich as Peggy Mason
 Robert Frazer as Douglas Wyman
 Pauline Garon as Jennie Howard
 Kathleen Clifford as Fifi Gordon
 Larry Steers as Jim Gordon
 Bonnie Hill as Mrs. Wyman
 Arthur Rankin as Jack Mason
 Brooks Benedict as Joe Wheeler
 James A. Marcus as Dan Mason

References

Bibliography
 Munden, Kenneth White. The American Film Institute Catalog of Motion Pictures Produced in the United States, Part 1. University of California Press, 1997.

External links

1925 films
1925 drama films
American black-and-white films
Silent American drama films
American silent feature films
1920s English-language films
Films directed by Edward LeSaint
1920s American films